Dongjiekou Station is a metro station of Line 1 of the Fuzhou Metro. This station is located at the intersection of Bayiqi North Road and Yangqiao East Road in Gulou District, Fuzhou, Fujian, China. Service at this station began on January 6, 2017. The Three Lanes and Seven Alleys is located southwest of this station.

Station layout 
Dongjiekou station has a round concourse on B1 floor, below which is the platform for Line 1. This station is also reserved for the planning Line 4.

Transport connections

Rail 
Schedule as of January 2020

References

External links 

Dongjiekou Station. Fuzhou Metro.

Railway stations in China opened in 2017
Fuzhou Metro stations